Mera Joota Hai Japani is a Hindi song with music by Shankar Jaikishan and lyrics by Shailendra, written for the 1955 Bollywood film Shree 420. It was performed by popular Bollywood star Raj Kapoor, though actually sung by playback singer Mukesh.

In the song, the narrator asserts pride in being Indian, despite their clothes all being from other countries. The chorus runs:

My shoes are Japanese, these trousers are English;
The red cap on my head is Russian, but still my heart is Indian.

Due to its patriotic themes, the song was widely embraced in its time as a representation of the newly sovereign nation of India. As India was gaining its status as a sovereign  democratic republic, this song depicted the casting off of the colonialist yoke and the recognition of the internationalist aim of uniting to make India and the world a better place.

The song was also a satirical retort at some of the political leaders and rich upper class of the newly independent India, who boasted of being swadeshi in their clothes, but were extremely western in their thought, outlook, affiliations and deeds.
 
This song gained international fame, particularly in the Soviet Union.

In popular culture 
 The opening section of the 1988 novel The Satanic Verses by Salman Rushdie has the character Gibreel Farishta singing an English translation of the opening lines of the song while he is falling out of an airplane.
 The first lines from the song are heard early in the 1991 film Mississippi Masala, at a significantly tense moment during the expulsion of Indians in Uganda in 1972.
 The 2000 Bollywood film Phir Bhi Dil Hai Hindustani is named after a line in the song.
 Bengali author Mahasweta Devi quoted the lyrics in her inaugural address at the 2006 Frankfurt Book Fair:
This is truly the age where the joota (shoe) is Japani (Japanese), patloon (pants) is Inglistani (English), the topi (hat) is Roosi (Russian), but the dil... dil (heart) is always Hindustani (Indian)... My country, torn, tattered, proud, beautiful, hot, humid, cold, sandy, shining India. My country.
 In the 2009 movie Today's Special starring Aasif Mandvi, "Mera Joota Hai Japani" plays on the radio in Naseeruddin Shah's cab.
 The 2012 re-make song Bollywood by Sasha Dith and DJ Rico Bernasconi featured on the Buddha Bar XIV compilation features the original recording.
 In the 2013 film Gravity, the Indian astronaut Shariff, voiced by Phaldut Sharma, sings the first line of the song while taking a break from his duties in space.
 In the 2006 novel The Inheritance of Loss, by Kiran Desai, Biju, an Indian immigrant in the USA finds solace in the song among his immigrant friends and colleagues.
 The song is played at the beginning of the American film Deadpool (2016).

See also
 Music of Bollywood

References

Hindi film songs
Number-one singles in India
Indian patriotic songs
Songs about Japan
Songs about India
1955 songs
Songs with music by Shankar Jaikishan
Mukesh (singer) songs
Songs with lyrics by Shailendra (lyricist)
Indian nationalism
Japan in non-Japanese culture